Andy Leleisi’uao (b. 1969) is a New Zealand artist of Samoan heritage known for his modern and post-modern Pacific paintings and art. He was paramount winner at the 26th annual Wallace Art Awards in 2017 and awarded a Senior Pacific Artist Award at the Arts Pasifika Awards in 2021.

Background 
Leleisi’uao was born in 1969 New Zealand and grew up in Māngere, South Auckland. He has one sister, his parents were both born in Samoa and are Pepe (Lalomauga, Upolu) and Tuifa’asisina Tinou'amea (Palauli, Savai'i). Leleisi'uao went to Māngere College and afterwards had some factory jobs. He studied at the Auckland University of Technology (AUT) School of Art and Design and received the first ever Pasifika Scholarship in 2000. In 2002 Leleisi’uao graduated with a Master of Fine Arts (with Honours). He has been a full time artist since 1996.

He has attended a number of arts residencies including a Research Scholarship at Macmillan Brown Centre for Pacific Studies, University of Canterbury, and the McCahon House Artists’ Residency in 2010. He spent three months in Taiwan in 2010 on an Asia New Zealand Foundation residency with the Taipei Artist Village.

Leleisi'uao has been based in the Auckland suburb of Māngere for over 40 years. He said about artists in an interview with Ema Tavola "For any artist to be mentally fecund, they have to be open."

Some of the visual references in his work are Stone Age rock art, classical Greek vase painting, Egyptian hieroglyphs, and Samoan siapa (tapa) cloth. It is said in his paintings that reoccurring motifs, "remind us of the inherent humanity of his creatures, and the universality of their struggle and endeavour within a limited existence". His work style has changed over the years of his practice, in the late 1990s his paintings were highly politicized dealing with subjects such as prejudice and racism, poverty and youth suicide amongst Pacific Island populations in New Zealand. Since the 2000s his work utilizes 'mythology and spiritualism' with 'fantastical creatures' although still drawing upon 'social dislocation'.

His 2006 exhibition Empowered Wallflower - Whitespace, Ponsonby was about a new generations relationship to Fa'a Samoa and how domestic aspects such as using a traditional salu broom are important.

In 2017 he won the Wallace Art Awards including a six-month residency in New York the 'International Studio and Curatorial Programme'.

His art work is held in the collections of Christchurch Art Gallery, The Museum of New Zealand Te Papa Tongarewa, the Auckland Art Gallery, the Chartwell Collection, and the James Wallace Arts Trust collection. And also Auckland University Collection, BCA Collection, Casula Powerhouse, Frankfurt Museum, Ilam University Collection, Manukau City Collection and Pataka Museum of Arts and Cultures.

Exhibitions 
This is a small selection of exhibitions. By 2019 Leleisi'uao had already had 85 solo exhibitions, and many groups ones.

2005: Cheeky Darkie - Whitespace, Ponsonby (featuring miniature sculptures)
2006: Andy Leleisi'uao: Empowered Wallflower - Whitespace, Ponsonby
2011: The World of Erodipolis, Milford Galleries, Dunedin
2012: Polyneitus Spring, Milford Galleries, Dunedin
2013: The Choirs of Lupotea, Milford Galleries, Dunedin
2014: Waking up to the Obscurity People, Te Uru Gallery, Auckland
2014: Waking up to the Oculus People, Milford Galleries, Queenstown
2015: Atmosphere People of Moana, Milford Galleries, Dunedin
2016: Ubiquitous People of Erodipolis, Milford Galleries, Dunedin
2017: Untitled, Fresh Gallery, Ōtara
2018: A Clouded Diaspora, Milford Galleries, Queenstown
2019:  KAMOAN MINE (survey exhibition), TSB Wallace Arts Centre, Pah Homestead
2019: Embryonic Uslands, Milford Galleries, Dunedin
2021: An Uncanny Catharsis of Unrequited Bones’ - Artis Gallery, Parnell
2021: Consiliation Gatherers, Milford Galleries, Queenstown

Awards 
2017 - Paramount winner at the 26th annual Wallace Art Awards
2021 - Senior Pacific Artist Award - Arts Pasifika Awards - Creative New Zealand.

Book 
Andy Leleisi'uao - KAMOAN MINE (accompaniment to his 2019 Kamoan Mine survey exhibition at the TSB Wallace Arts Centre, Pah Homestead).

References 

Living people
21st-century New Zealand painters
21st-century New Zealand male artists
Samoan painters
Artists from Auckland
1969 births